Dawn of Azazel is a death metal band from New Zealand.  They have played around the world in countries such as U.S., Switzerland, Spain, Portugal, Ireland, Czech Republic, Denmark, the United Kingdom, Germany, the Netherlands, Belgium, France, Austria, Thailand, Indonesia and Australia.  In February 2008 it was announced that Martin Cavanagh would be departing the band, shortly after, He was replaced by Jeremy Suckling of Wellington deathcore band Scoria. Dawn of Azazel have finished recording the new album entitled 'Relentless', set to be released on 13 October on Unique Leader Records – The album was recorded at Mana Studios in Florida and was produced by Brian Elliott.

Media coverage
In 2005, it was reported that vocalist Rigel Walshe was a constable in the New Zealand Police, with questions being raised about the contrast between his job as a public servant and the violent lyrics in Dawn of Azazel CDs. No official action was taken as his police work and singing careers were kept separate.

Previous lineups

Law of the Strong Lineup – 2001–2004
 Rigel Walshe – vocals; Bass guitar
 Joe Bonnett- Guitar
 Tony Angelov – Guitar
 Phil Osbourne – drums

Sedition Lineup 2004 – 2008
 Rigel Walshe – vocals; Bass guitar
 Joe Bonnett – guitar
 Martin Cavanagh – drums

Relentless (2009)
 Rigel Walshe – vocals; Bass guitar
 Joe Bonnett – guitar
 Jeremy Suckling – drums

Personnel

 Brian Elliott – Record Producer

Current lineup
 Rigel Walshe – vocals; bass
 Joe Bonnett – guitar
 Jeremy Suckling – drums
 Nik Davies – Guitar

Discography

Singles

References

External links
 Dawn Of Azazel's Official Website
 Dawn Of Azazel's Official Forums 
 Dawn Of Azazel's myspace.com Profile

New Zealand death metal musical groups
New Zealand black metal musical groups
Blackened death metal musical groups
Musical groups established in 1997